The 1915 Alberta liquor plebiscite was the first plebiscite to ask voters in Alberta whether the province should implement prohibition by ratifying the proposed Liquor Act. The plebiscite was the culmination of years of lobbying by the province's temperance movements and agricultural groups, and was proposed through the recently implemented form of direct democracy, the Direct Legislation Act. Alberta voters approved the plebiscite on prohibition, which was implemented eleven months after the vote. The June 21, 1915 plebiscite was the first of three province-wide plebiscites held in a seven year period related to liquor in Alberta.

Background

Prohibition in the North-West Territories 
Prohibition was not a new concept for Albertans since prior to the creation of the Province of Alberta in 1905, prohibition had been law in the North-West Territories from 1873 to 1891. Prohibition time was then a federal policy intended to prevent the Territories' Indigenous population from purchasing liquor from American whiskey traders, but white settlers were permitted to import liquor with easily-available approval from the Lieutenant Governor. In 1891, prohibition was repealed in the North-West Territories with the Liquor License Ordinance, which was administered by the Board of License Commissioners, rather than the local government, following the model already in place in Ontario and Manitoba. The ordinance allowed a hotels in communities to be issued a license to serve liquor. A community with less than 500 people was limited to two licensed establishments, with each additional 500 persons being allowed the maximum number of licensed establishments in the community increase by one. The ordinance also required licensed hotels to provide food and lodging. Liquor laws were enforced by liquor inspectors, and an order by two concurring justices of the peace could prevent a person from buying liquor for one year if the individual was known to drink excessively.

Prohibition remained a significant national issue in the late-19th century, and during the 1896 Canadian federal election, Wilfrid Laurier promised that a Liberal government would provide Canadians with the opportunity to register their opinion on the sale of liquor. In the non-binding 1898 Canadian prohibition plebiscite a slim majority of the country approved prohibition, with 51.26 per cent in favour with 44 per cent of the electorate participating. In the North-West Territories, which included present-day Alberta, Saskatchewan, and parts of Manitoba, prohibition was approved by a clear majority with 68.8 per cent of voters. Despite the slim national majority, Laurier's government chose not to introduce a federal bill on prohibition.

Direct legislation 
Following confederation of Alberta in 1905, the movement for direct legislation took form. The Grain Growers Guide published articles about the benefits of direct legislation, and the growing United Farmers of Alberta pressured the Liberal government starting in 1909. It was promoted by the Conservative Party, in March 1912 and finally came to fruition with the Direct Legislation Act in 1913.

The minority Conservative Party also sought to capitalize on the prohibition issue prior to the 1913 election, with the party convention in March 1912 committing to holding a plebiscite on prohibition. The Liberal government was less willing to commit to prohibition since it recognized the revenue generated through licensing. The Liberals instead advocated for incremental changes through reform to improve conditions related to liquor.

The temperance movement quickly responded to the new tool of direct legislation by providing a petition signed by 23,656 persons for a "Prohibitory Liquor Act" to Premier Arthur Sifton. Under the law, he had to pass such a law or hold a referendum on the issue. 

The premier tabled the petition in the 3rd Alberta Legislature on October 13, 1914. Sifton created a special committee to study the petition consisting of Members George P. Smith, John M. Glendenning, and Albert Ewing. A week later on October 19, the special committee declared the petition conformed with the requirements of the Direct Legislation Act, and the Legislature moved for the Liquor Act to be submitted to a vote of the electors.

The referendum date was set for July 21, 1915.

Arguments on prohibition 

Prohibition was pushed forward primarily by two temperance groups, the Women's Christian Temperance Movement (WCTM) and the Temperance and Moral Reform League (TMRL), as well as the United Farmers of Alberta. The TMRL shared many of the same ideals as the WCTM but was structured to mirror a political party, with a central executive and local organizations in each of Alberta's electoral districts. The president of the TMRL during the runup to the plebiscite was T. H. Miller. Both the WCTM and the TMRL sought to ensure that temperance MLAs were elected, irrespective of party, and that strong representation existed politically in Alberta with temperance values being shared by Lieutenant Governor George H. V. Bulyea, Premier Alexander Cameron Rutherford, Crown Minister William Henry Cushing, and Conservative leader R. B. Bennett. Additional arguments for prohibition were printed in William McCartney Davidson's Calgary Albertan. The WTCM named Louise McKinney President of the Alberta-Saskatchewan Union of the organization in 1908, and McKinney led the WTCM through the prohibition plebiscite. Two years after the plebiscite, McKinney was elected as a Member of the Legislative Assembly of Alberta in the 1917 general election and became the first woman legislator in the British Empire.

The public proponents of prohibition were primarily preachers and newspapers and effectively drew comparisons between the struggle of soldiers in the First World War fight against the "evil" Central Powers and the temperance campaign's battle against the "evil" of liquor. Other strong arguments made by proponents of prohibition included the better use of valuable grains for the war effort, rather than alcohol, and showing alcoholics as wasteful with money and neglectful of their family obligations. The TMRL released a statement estimating that liquor sales in Alberta cost the public $12,292,215 per year and prepared a $30,000 budget to campaign on the issue. The TMRL campaign included bringing speakers in from across Canada and the United States to discuss the benefits of prohibition, including the leader of the Ontario Liberal Party Newton Rowell. One major surprise for proponents of prohibition was Bob Edwards's public support in his newspaper the Calgary Eye-Opener, despite his reputation as an alcoholic.

Arguments against prohibition were made primarily by [[Ukrainian Canadians
]], French Canadians, and some of the soldiera. The groups often brought in American speakers to discuss the failures of prohibition, and their efforts were subsequently branded as unpatriotic by proponents of prohibition, as the United States had yet to enter the First World War. Opposition by men aged 18 to 40 was limited, as many were shipped overseas for the war effort. Other arguments included that the Liquor Act was ineffective at closing liquor channels, government liquor vendors were a potential source for corruption, drug stores would become liquor stores and physicians would become liquor salesmen, and liquor would still be accessible by the rich while the working class would not have the same access to liquor. Furthermore, those against prohibition noted that many US states had repealed their prohibition laws. The anti-prohibition groups brought in the speaker A. C. Windle, who vividly described the issues that would arise from prohibition, including a loss of economic activity and jobs for bartenders, hotels employees, truck drivers, and others.

The two major Alberta newspapers, the Calgary Herald and Edmonton Journal, argued against prohibition and instead favored the idea of temperance without legal consequences.

Aftermath
The province voted by a large majority in favour of the new Liquor Act, which enforced prohibition on the province effective July 1, 1916, eleven months after the vote. The results of the plebiscite were binding.

The aftermath for hotels and clubs was challenging, and many closed down or sold out prior to the Liquor Act coming into force. A large number flocked to the hotels and bars on June 30, 1916 on the last day of liquor service, but bar operators found it difficult to estimate necessary liquor supplies adequately, as they did not want surplus inventory. Red Deer bars ran dry on June 29, and Calgary bars were reported to have run out of beer by noon of June 30. Reporters in Edmonton observed patrons lining up to purchase liquor to take home, rather than consume the alcohol in the bar. The historian Hugh Dempsey noted that the last day before prohibition was a celebration across Alberta, with minimal disruption or arrests by prepared police officers.

Prohibition proved to be difficult for the government to administer, with the North-West Mounted Police (NWMP) refusing to enforce the resource intensive law. Prohibition, the reduced manpower from the First World War, and additional domestic wartime responsibilities resulted in the Alberta government agreeing to withdraw the NWMP and form the Alberta Provincial Police in March 1917. Albertans found numerous ways around prohibition, including drinking spirits under 2.5 per cent alcohol  and private importation, which were barred under federal law during First World War and then again after 1920,  and alcohol for medicinal purposes. Alberta's Liquor Act did not prohibit the manufacturing of liquor in Alberta.

The financial consequence of prohibition to the Alberta government was significant. Revenue from government-controlled liquor sales dropped to nearly zero in 1916 and did not start to recover until 1919, when doctors began writing wholesale prescriptions in the wake of the Spanish flu. It was estimated that the population rejecting the plebiscite would have resulted in the government deficit being reduced by at least $1 million annually. The government had reported an income from liquor licenses in 1914 of $251,575.

In the 1920 Canadian liquor plebiscite, Albertans once again voted in favour of continuing prohibition and banning the importation of liquor across provincial borders, a resumption of the federal First World War prohibition law, but by a decidedly smaller margin, with 60.55 per cent in favour. 

The Alberta government held another plebiscite in 1923. This time, the electorate overwhelmingly approved government controlled liquor sales and ending prohibition in Alberta seven years after it had begun.

Tabulation of results

Turnout 
The Government of Alberta did not provide an official turnout for the 1915 Alberta liquor plebiscite, however the estimated turnout would have been around 70 per cent of eligible voters. A total of 95,804 people voted in the plebiscite, while the population of the province in 1911 was 374,000, with a voting population of approximately 107,487, which is estimated to have increased to between 136,000 to 140,000 by 1915.

References

Works cited
 
 
 
 
 
 
 

Primary Sources

Further reading 
 
 

1915 elections in Canada
1915
July 1915 events
1915 in Alberta